Novobelura dohertyi is a moth of the family Thyrididae first described by Warren in 1897. It is found in Sri Lanka and Malaysia.

References

Moths of Asia
Moths described in 1897
Thyrididae